Saint-Mathias Water Aerodrome  is located  north of Saint-Mathias-sur-Richelieu on the Richelieu River, Quebec, Canada.

See also
 List of airports in the Montreal area

References

Registered aerodromes in Montérégie
Seaplane bases in Quebec
Rouville Regional County Municipality